Galactophora is a genus of flowering plants in the family Apocynaceae, first described as a genus in 1932. It is native to South America.

Species
 Galactophora angustifolia J.F.Morales - Colombia
 Galactophora colellana Morillo - SE Colombia, S Venezuela, NW Brazil
 Galactophora crassifolia (Müll.Arg.) Woodson - Venezuela, Colombia, Peru, Bolivia, W Brazil
 Galactophora pulchella Woodson - S Venezuela, NW Brazil
 Galactophora pumila Monach. - SE Colombia, S Venezuela
 Galactophora schomburgkiana Woodson - S Venezuela, S Guyana, Roraima

References

Apocynaceae genera
Malouetieae